Tevin Campbell is the fourth studio album by the American R&B singer Tevin Campbell. It was released by Qwest Records and Warner Bros. on February 23, 1999. The album features production from Stevie J, Wyclef Jean, and others. Campbell released three singles, having only one of them chart on the US Billboard Hot 100, "Another Way". The other two singles are "Losing All Control" and "For Your Love", both with minor showings on the R&B charts.

Critical reception

AllMusic editor Tim Sheridan wrote: "Dig the slow jams: This young R&B singer kicks out some easy beats and infectious hooks with the help from the likes of Wyclef Jean, Quincy Jones, and Stevie J [...] Granted, some of the material doesn't rise above the standard vocal grandstanding, but there are signs of great things to come." Cheo Tyehimba, writing for Entertainment Weekly, found that "Campbell’s fourth effort is pure R&B: spare and sensitive. One or two songs fall short, but Tevin Campbell is anchored with jams like the pulsing 'Another Way' and the Wyclef Jean-produced 'Never Again'." 

Billboard called the album a "return to form" and concluded: "From this Quincy Jones protégé, who embodies the romantic side of his mentor's musicality, an album for the R&B mainstream with crossover potential at AC and lite jazz." Vibe  editor Larry Flick wrote that "the good news is that Campbell has evolved into an assured (and yes, remarkably mature) stylist, capable of rising above the familiar formulas of his producers and giving their material a much-needed fresh spin [...] Perhaps most appealing about Tevin Campbell is the artist's ability to quietly breathe volumes of emotional subtext into a lyric [...] At a time when many of his R&B colleagues equate soul with shriek, Campbell's subtle phrasing and intimate demeanor are ultimately more inviting and will render his recordings far more durable."

Chart performance
Tevin Campbell debuted and peaked at number 88 on the US Billboard 200. It marked Campbell's lowest opening up to then and was another considerable decline after the lackluster success of previous effort Back to the World (1996). On the Top R&B/Hip-Hop Albums chart, it reached number 31.

Track listing

Charts

References

1999 albums
Tevin Campbell albums
Qwest Records albums
Albums produced by Stevie J